Lyun may refer to:

Lyun, common the Ryun, Ryan, Luan, Lynn
Lyun, common the Lian (練, 鍊, 戀, 聯, 蓮, 憐, 煉, 璉), Luan (攣), Nian (輦)
Lyun, common the Chinese Lian (surname) (連)
Luandi (攣鞮), Base Family of Liu Yuan (劉淵) the Han Zhao
Lyn (singer), South Korean singer